Hernán Senillosa (born October 1, 1977 in Buenos Aires) is an Argentine rugby union player. Senillosa rugby position is centre.

His brother Santiago "Aguaviva" Senillosa, is also an important rugby player.

Senillosa made his debut for the national side on April 28, 2002, in a match against , and has received 30 caps in total, scoring 128 points (as of September 23, 2007). Senillosa was in the Argentine squad for the 2003 and 2007 Rugby World Cups, where he has made 4 appearances in total.

He played all of his amateur sport life as a centre in the Hindu Club. In December 2010, he was suspended by 52 weeks, after a semi-final of the Top 14, in a game with La Plata Rugby Club, after altercations with the referee. He returned to competition afterwards but faced a serious injury upon his comeback. In March 2013, he announced his return to action once again, after an operation.

References

External links
 UAR profile

1977 births
Living people
Argentine rugby union players
Rugby union wings
Rugby union players from Buenos Aires
Argentina international rugby union players
Hindú Club players
La Plata Rugby Club players
Argentina international rugby sevens players